Murtaza (Mortaźa) is a rural locality (a village) in Sterlibashevsky Selsoviet, Sterlibashevsky District, Bashkortostan, Russia. The population was 165 as of 2010. There are 7 streets.

Geography 
Murtaza is located 10 km north of Sterlibashevo (the district's administrative centre) by road. Nikolskoye is the nearest rural locality.

References 

Rural localities in Sterlibashevsky District